Célia Nawal Jodar (born 20 April 1988), also known as Célia Jodar, is a French-born Moroccan slalom canoeist who has competed at the international level since 2009.

She competed in the women's K1 event at the delayed 2020 Summer Olympics in Tokyo, where she finished 27th after being eliminated in the heats.

References

External links

 
 
 
 
  

1988 births
Living people
Moroccan female canoeists
Olympic canoeists of Morocco
Canoeists at the 2020 Summer Olympics
Sportspeople from Fontainebleau
Sportspeople from Pau, Pyrénées-Atlantiques